Oxford Records was a record label active in the United States of America from roughly 1906 until 1916. The label was produced for Sears by several labels, including Columbia and Albany Indestructible Cylinders for cylinders and Leeds & Catlin, Zon-O-Phone, and Columbia for discs. No recording activity was undertaken by Sears. All discs were single-sided.

History

In 1906, Sears introduced the Oxford disc to replace the earlier Harvard brand. These discs in the 11000 and 16000 series, were produced by Leeds & Catlin. The 1908 Sears catalog introduced 7-inch discs listed at 21 cents that were pressed by Columbia and numbered in the 7000 series. In 1909 10-inch discs from Zonophone, retailing at 30 cents, were introduced. Fall 1911 saw Sears return to Columbia for pressings. These later discs are the most commonly found. The brand was phased out in 1916 for the new Silvertone brand, although records with the Oxford label were still being shipped in late 1917. Recordings appearing on the Oxford label could be recorded anywhere from 1901 to 1916. The take number is important to dating the recording, particularly for Columbia pressings. Cal Stewart's "I'm Old But I'm Awfully Tough" (Oxford 22) first appeared on Columbia in 1901, but the issued take number of was probably recorded much later.

Repertoire
Oxford discs contain the same material as released by the producing company. For the most part the titles released were popular items that were deemed likely to sell over a long period of time. A few sides from Columbia's ethnic matrix series were also released. Artists are usually generic (i.e. "band", "banjo solo" "baritone") for the earlier pressings. These were the studio ensembles of the recording company and musicians commonly used by all record companies of the time such as Vess Ossman and Arthur Collins. Later Columbia pressings often gave artist credit when such artist was not under exclusive contract to Columbia at the time.

Notable artists appearing on Oxford
 Irving Berlin
 Henry Burr
 Arthur Collins
 Collins & Harlan
 Edward M. Favor
 George J. Gaskin
 Byron G. Harlan
 Ada Jones
 Bohumir Kryl
 Harry Macdonough
 Billy Murray
 Vess Ossman
 Charles A. Prince
 Peerless Quartet
 Steve Porter
 Len Spencer
 Frank C. Stanley
 Cal Stewart
 Walter Van Brunt
 Bert Williams

See also
 List of record labels

References

Record labels established in 1906
Defunct record labels of the United States
Cylinder record producers
Record labels disestablished in 1916
Record labels owned by Sears, Roebuck and Company
American companies established in 1906